Hemenway is an unincorporated community in Lane Township, Warrick County, in the U.S. state of Indiana.

History
A post office was established at Hemenway in 1900, but closed soon after, in 1903. Members of the Hemenway family were among the early settlers in the area.

Geography

References

Unincorporated communities in Warrick County, Indiana
Unincorporated communities in Indiana